The von Zimmern family (Herren von Zimmern), after 1538 counts (Grafen) of Zimmern, was a Swabian noble family.
The family is first mentioned in 1080, and its male line was extinct in 1594.
Their name is now mostly known from the Zimmern Chronicle, written in the mid 16th century by  count Froben Christoph von Zimmern.

Their original domain was in the Black Forest, in part of the modern  Rottweil district. Their original castle was Herrenzimmern near Bösingen (ruined since the 17th century). In 1415, the von Zimmern acquired Wildenstein Castle.

In 1488, the escalation of the Werdenberg feud,  Johannes Werner the elder fell under imperial ban and most of the von Zimmern  possessions was given to the Werdenberger lords of Sigmaringen; the possessions were eventually regained, by Johannes Werners's son, Johannes Werner the younger, in 1503.
In 1508, the von Zimmern possessions were divided into three parts.
 
The family reached the peak of its influence in 1538, when they were elevated to the rank of count (Graf). It was extinct in 1594 with the death of  Wilhelm von Zimmern, only son of  Froben Christoph von Zimmern.

Known family members 
 Katharina von Zimmern (1478-1547), last abbess of the Fraumünster Abbey

References

 Erica Bastress-Dukehart: The Zimmern chronicle. Nobility, memory, and self-representation in sixteenth-century Germany. Ashgate, Aldershot 2002,  (review)
 Casimir Bumiller, Bernhard Rüth, Edwin Ernst Weber (ed.): Mäzene, Sammler, Chronisten. Die Grafen von Zimmern und die Kultur des schwäbischen Adels. Belser, Stuttgart 2012,  (table of contents, PDF)
 Otto Franklin: Die freien Herren und Grafen von Zimmern. Beiträge zur Rechtsgeschichte nach der Zimmerischen Chronik. Mohr, Freiburg 1884.
Holger Kruse: "Zimmern". In:Lexikon des Mittelalters vol. 9, LexMA-Verlag, München 1998,  616–618.

Swabian nobility